Wilczków may refer to the following places in Poland:
Wilczków, Środa Śląska County in Lower Silesian Voivodeship (south-west Poland)
Wilczków, Wrocław County in Lower Silesian Voivodeship (south-west Poland)
Wilczków, Poddębice County in Łódź Voivodeship (central Poland)
Wilczków, Sieradz County in Łódź Voivodeship (central Poland)